Avocado sauce is a sauce prepared using avocado as a primary ingredient. Commercial sauces are typically prepared to have a thin, sauce-like consistency that is pourable. Commercial preparation involves mixing the avocado using high-speed blenders, which breaks up the pulp. Spices, water and emulsifiers are added, and the resultant product is then typically frozen to prevent browning. Popular brands include Kumana and Herdez.

Additional ingredients in avocado sauce can include tomatillo, onion, chili peppers, cilantro, pepper and garlic.

Preparation
One possible preparation of homemade avocado sauce can be made by blending yogurt, avocado, lemon juice, vegetable oil, crushed garlic, sugar, cumin, seasoning salt and red pepper sauce.

Uses
Avocado sauce is used as an ingredient and topping for meat dishes and dishes such as fajitas, taquitos and tacos, among others.

See also
 Guacamole
 List of avocado dishes
 List of sauces

References

External links
 Avocado sauces and purees. Californiaavocado.com

Avocado dishes
Sauces